James Browne (born 29 July 1960) is an Irish former sportsperson. He played Gaelic football for his local club Ballina Stephenites and was a member of the senior Mayo county team from 1986 until 1990. Jimmy captained Mayo in the 1989 All-Ireland Senior Football Championship Final and was selected on the GAA All Star team of that year.

References

1960 births
Living people
Ballina Stephenites Gaelic footballers
Gaelic football backs
Mayo inter-county Gaelic footballers
People from Ballina, County Mayo